Government Saadat College is an old public college in Karatia, Tangail, Bangladesh. It is often referred to as Karatia College.It was established in July 1926. First Principal of the college Ibrahim Khan who is the Founder and Principal of Bhuapur College at Bhuapur, Tangail. Later named Ibrahim Khan Govt. College.

History

Sadat college is the first college in Bangladesh established by a Muslim Zamindar. It was founded by Wazed Ali Khan Panni, a zamindar and educationalist of Tangail. He named it after his grandfather Saadat Ali Khan Panni. The founder member of Saadat college was Principal Ibrahim Khan. He was the first chief executive of the college. He worked in college till 1947. The college was upgraded as a degree college in 1938. In Saadat college, the Honours course was commenced in 1966 and the Masters course was commenced in 1974. The Government of Bangladesh promulgated the Saadat college as a national university college on July 7, 1979. It has Honours programme in 16 subjects and Masters programme in 10 subjects. The college is recognised as a postgraduate college.
The college played a vital role in the liberation war of Bangladesh.

Faculties and departments
Saadat University comprises following four faculties:
Faculty of Arts (B.A)
 Department of English
 Department of Bengali
 Department of History
 Department of Philosophy
 Department of Islamic history and culture
 Department of Islamic study
Faculty of Science (B.SC)
 Department of Physics
 Department of Chemistry
 Department of Math
 Department of Zoology
 Department of Botany
Faculty of Social Science (B.S.S)
 Department of Economics
 Department of Social welfare
 Department of Political science
Faculty of Commerce (B.B.A.)
 Department of Accounting
 Department of Management
 Department of Marketing
 Department of Banking  & Finance
The college offers Master degree in English, Zoology, Chemistry, Mathematics.

Facilities and social organisations  

The main building of this college is surrounded within  of area. Inside the campus area there are one college auditorium, two students' common room, one central library, Health services, one sports office, one B.N.C.C office room, one Rover scouts office, one Mosque and one canteen available for students. There are 5 laboratories available for science faculty - (I) Physics (ii) Chemistry (iii) Math (iv) Zoology and (v) Botany. The college also has 16 seminar rooms.

The college library has 200 rare medieval manuscripts, including some other manuscripts written by Shahnama. Since its inception, the college has been providing lodging facilities for its students.

BNCC Unit 

After the establishment of the Bangladesh National Cadet Corps, The BNCC made its debut at Government Saadat College. The unit's first P.U.O. Md. Abdul Majid and the first C.U.O. Md. Nobi Haider Badal. From that point inwards, the unit of Saadat College BNCC got modernized through the many changes and the arrival of the BNCC Women's Platoon on 1 August 2018. The cadets of Saadat College have been able to play a vital role in the development activities undertaken for the welfare of the country and the nation. The unit hopes to establish itself as a second-class self-contained military unit in the future.

Halls of residence

There are 6 halls to provide a convenient accommodation  for Saadat college students. The 4 for males and the other 2 is for females. The halls for male students are:
 Wazed Ali Khan Panni Hall
 Ebrahim Khan Hall
 Somman Hall
 Uttara Hall
And the halls for female students are:
 Fazilatunnesa Hall
 Chhatrinibas Hall
In addition, More steps are being taken to increase accommodation for female students.

Notable alumni
Some of the notable alumni of Government Saadat College. 
 Abdul Haque (Writer)
 Bonde Ali Mia (Poet)
 Osman Ghani Khan (Former chairman of the United Nations Board of Auditors)
 P. C. Sorcar (Magician)
 Selim Al Din (Dramatist)
 Shajahan Siraj (Ex-minister)
 Shamsul Haque (First Secretary of Awami Muslim League)

See also
 Karatia, Tangail

References

External links

 Government Saadat College at Facebook

Educational institutions established in 1926
1926 establishments in India
Education in Tangail